Maple Leaves is an extended play by Swedish indie pop musician Jens Lekman. It was released on 1 October 2003 on Service and on 3 February 2004 on Secretly Canadian. The songs on the EP can also be found on Lekman's 2005 release, Oh You're So Silent Jens.

The title song "Maple Leaves" centers on a hallmark of Lekman's lyrics, puns and an advanced level of understanding of English idioms. It is a melancholic love song or reflection on lost love about the singer misunderstanding a woman's ennui or disillusionment primarily indicated by her saying "make believe" and the singer optimistically hearing it as "maple leaves".

Track listing

Charts

References

2003 EPs
Jens Lekman EPs